Kadanthankudi is a village in the Pattukkottai taluk of Thanjavur district, Tamil Nadu, India.

Demographics 

As per the 2001 census, Kadathankudi had a total population of 1527 with 795 males and 732 females. The sex ratio was 921. The literacy rate was 73.37.

References 

 

Villages in Thanjavur district